Robert Anthony Ale (born 4 September 1973) is a Samoan rugby union player. He plays as a prop.

Career
His first international cap was during a match against Tonga, at Apia, on 28 June  1997. He was part of the 1999 Rugby World Cup roster, replacing the injured Fosi Pala'amo, where he played 4 matches. In the NPC he played for South Canterbury, Taranaki and Wanganui.

References

External links

Robert T. Ale at New Zealand Rugby History

1971 births
Living people
Samoan rugby union players
Samoan expatriate sportspeople in New Zealand
Rugby union props
Samoa international rugby union players
Samoan expatriate rugby union players
Expatriate rugby union players in New Zealand
South Canterbury rugby union players
Taranaki rugby union players
Wanganui rugby union players